Thomas C. Quinn is an American physician and infectious disease researcher specializing in the study of HIV/AIDS. He is a professor of medicine and pathology at the Johns Hopkins School of Medicine and director of the Johns Hopkins Center for Global Health. He is also a professor of international health, epidemiology, and molecular microbiology and immunology at the Johns Hopkins School of Public Health and a professor of nursing the Johns Hopkins School of Nursing. In addition, he serves as Associate Director for International Research at the National Institute of Allergy and Infectious Diseases.

Education and career
Quinn was educated at the University of Notre Dame, receiving his bachelor's and master's degrees from there in 1969 and 1970, respectively. In 1974, he received his M.D. from the Northwestern University Feinberg School of Medicine. He has been board-certified by the American Board of Internal Medicine in internal medicine since 1977 and in infectious disease since 1982. In 2004, he was elected to the Institute of Medicine of the National Academy of Sciences, and in 2006, he was named the founding director of the Johns Hopkins University Center for Global Health. He is also a fellow of the American Association for the Advancement of Science and the Infectious Diseases Society of America.

References

External links
Faculty page

Living people
20th-century American physicians
21st-century American physicians
American infectious disease physicians
HIV/AIDS researchers
Johns Hopkins University faculty
University of Notre Dame alumni
Northwestern University alumni
Members of the National Academy of Medicine
Fellows of the American Association for the Advancement of Science
Fellows of the Infectious Diseases Society of America
Year of birth missing (living people)